George Barry Wilkinson  (16 June 1935 – May 2004) was an English footballer who played as a wing half for Liverpool and Tranmere Rovers in the Football League. Wilkinson signed for Liverpool from amateur team Bishop Auckland, with whom he won the FA Amateur Cup. He made appearances for the club during the 1953–54 season and was mainly used as a half-back. He remained with the club for several seasons but was unable to claim a regular starting place in the side. Upon the arrival of Bill Shankly in 1959, he was transferred to Tranmere Rovers.

Wilkinson was born in Bishop Auckland in 1935 and died in Liverpool in 2004 at the age of 68.

References

External links

1935 births
2004 deaths
Sportspeople from Bishop Auckland
Footballers from County Durham
Association football wing halves
English footballers
West Auckland Town F.C. players
Bishop Auckland F.C. players
Liverpool F.C. players
Bangor City F.C. players
Tranmere Rovers F.C. players
Holyhead Town F.C. players
English Football League players